The Panorpodidae are a small family of scorpionflies. Of the two genera, Brachypanorpa occurs only in the United States, and Panorpodes occurs in East Asia, with a single species in California. Unlike their sister group Panorpidae, the family generally has short jaws, amongst the shortest of all mecopterans. Brachypanorpa is thought to be phytophagous, consuming the epidermis of soft leaves, and a similar diet is suggested for Panorpodes.

Genera
The family contains extant 13 species in two genera:

 Brachypanorpa Carpenter, 1931 (five species: United States)
 Panorpodes MacLachlan, 1875 (eight species: Japan, Korea, California) Fossil species known from Eocene aged Baltic amber
In addition, the following fossil genus is also known:

 †Austropanorpodes Petrulevicius 2009 Laguna del Hunco Formation, Argentina, Eocene (Ypresian)

References

Mecoptera
Insect families